Floris is an unincorporated community in northwest Beaver County, Oklahoma, United States.

History
The community was named after Floris Derthwick, who was the daughter of the townsite owner, Byron S. Derthwick.

The Floris post office operated from August 7, 1903 to September 30, 1925.

The Floris Grain Elevator, which was built along the tracks of the now-defunct Beaver, Meade and Englewood Railroad, is on the National Register of Historic Places listings in Beaver County, Oklahoma.

References

Unincorporated communities in Beaver County, Oklahoma
Populated places established in 1903
Unincorporated communities in Oklahoma
1903 establishments in Oklahoma Territory
Oklahoma Panhandle